The Compaq ProSignia is a discontinued computer brand by Compaq for small businesses. It was the mid-range successor to the Compaq SystemPro brand. It was discontinued in 2000.

Desktops

 5/60
 200
 300
 330: MidTower - PIII 500 MHz - 128 MB / up to 384 MB
 500
 600

Laptops

ProSignia 150
Presario based. 1999. 50x313x257 mm; 12.1" (800x600) or 14.1" (1024x768) screen (3.3 or 3.6 kg).
RAGE LT PRO. 32/64 MB soldered, up to 160/192 MB (1 slot). AMD K6-2 (350-475).

ProSignia 155

ProSignia 162

ProSignia 165

ProSignia 170
1999. Low-end version of Armada M700.

314x249x28mm; Pointing stick or touchpad. 2.1+ kg. Pentium II or III (366 or 450-700, instead 650-1000). 13.3 or 14" screen. ATI Mobility P (8 MB). Magnesium top cover. MultiBay. 32 MB (PII version, up to 288 MB) or 64 MB (PIII version, up to 320 MB) RAM.

ProSignia 190

ProSignia 197

References 

ProSignia